The Hungary men's national water polo team represents Hungary in international men's water polo competitions and is controlled by the Hungarian Water Polo Association. It is considered the world's top power in the history of water polo, having won 16 Olympic, 11 World Championship, 10 FINA World Cup, eight FINA World League, 24 European Championship and 16 Summer Universiade medals for a total of 88.

Competitive record

Medals
Updated after 2020 Summer Olympics

 Champions   Runners-up   Third place   Fourth place

Olympic Games

Hungary missed five Olympics, but they have won the title nine times, which is a record. As of today, there are only seven tournaments in which Hungary participated but did not receive a medal.

World Championships
Hungary has taken part in every World Championships. They have won this championship three times: in 1973, 2003 and 2013.

World Cup
The Hungarian national team missed three editions of the World Cup, but they won it four times: in 1979, 1995, 1999 and 2018.

World League
Hungary has taken part in the first edition of the FINA Water Polo World League in 2002. They have won the gold medal one and two years later. In 2006 and from 2008 to 2012, Hungary did not participate in the World League.

European Championships

Hungary missed only one European Championship, in 1950, and they have won the tournament 13 times, which is (as in the World Championships) a record. No team has a better result than Hungary in history of the European Championship.

Friendship Games

Europa Cup
 2018 – 6th place
 2019 –  Gold medal

Team

Current squad
Roster for the 2020 Summer Olympics.

Individual all-time records

Most appearances and goals
Total number of matches played in official competitions only.

Statistics accurate as of matches played 18 January 2016

Olympic statistics

Five-time Olympians
 Dezső Gyarmati: 1948, 1952, 1956, 1960, 1964;
 Tibor Benedek: 1992, 1996, 2000, 2004, 2008;
 Tamás Kásás: 1996, 2000, 2004, 2008, 2012.

Olympians with four or more medals
 Dezső Gyarmati: 5 medals, 3 gold, 1 silver and 1 bronze (1948 , 1952 , 1956 , 1960 , 1964 );
 György Kárpáti: 4 medals, 3 gold and 1 bronze (1952 , 1956 , 1960 , 1964 ).
 András Bodnár: 4 medals, 1 gold, 1 silver and 2 bronze (1960 , 1964 , 1968 , 1972 ).
 ifj. István Szívós: 4 medals, 1 gold, 1 silver and 2 bronze (1968 , 1972 , 1976 , 1980 ).

Olympians with three gold medals
 Dezső Gyarmati: 1952 , 1956 , 1964 ;
 György Kárpáti: 1952 , 1956 , 1964 ;
 Tibor Benedek: 2000 , 2004 , 2008 ;
 Péter Biros: 2000 , 2004 , 2008 ;
 Tamás Kásás: 2000 , 2004 , 2008 ;
 Gergely Kiss: 2000 , 2004 , 2008 ;
 Tamás Molnár: 2000 , 2004 , 2008 ;
 Zoltán Szécsi: 2000 , 2004 , 2008 .

World Championship statistics

Players with four or more medals
 Norbert Madaras: 4 medals, 2 gold and 2 silver (2003 , 2005 , 2007 , 2013 );
 Rajmund Fodor: 4 medals, 1 gold and 3 silver (1998 , 2003 , 2005 , 2007 );
 Tamás Kásás: 4 medals, 1 gold and 3 silver (1998 , 2003 , 2005 , 2007 );
 Gergely Kiss: 4 medals, 1 gold and 3 silver (1998 , 2003 , 2005 , 2007 );
 Tamás Molnár: 4 medals, 1 gold and 3 silver (1998 , 2003 , 2005 , 2007 );
 Tibor Benedek: 4 medals, 1 gold, 2 silver and 1 bronze (1991 , 1998 , 2003 , 2007 ).

Players with two gold medals
 Norbert Madaras: 2003 , 2013 .

World Cup statistics

Players with four or more medals
 Rajmund Fodor: 6 medals, 2 gold, 3 silver and 1 bronze (1993 , 1995 , 1997 , 1999 , 2002 , 2006 );
 Tamás Kásás: 5 medals, 2 gold, 2 silver and 1 bronze (1995 , 1997 , 1999 , 2002 , 2006 );
 Tibor Benedek: 4 medals, 1 gold, 2 silver and 1 bronze (1993 , 1995 , 1997 , 2002 );
 Gergely Kiss: 4 medals, 1 gold, 2 silver and 1 bronze (1997 , 1999 , 2002 , 2006 );
 Tamás Molnár: 4 medals, 1 gold, 2 silver and 1 bronze (1997 , 1999 , 2002 , 2006 ).

Players with two gold medals
 Rajmund Fodor: 1995 , 1999 ;
 Tamás Kásás: 1995 , 1999 ;
 Zoltán Kósz: 1995 , 1999 ;
 Frank Tóth: 1995 , 1999 ;
 Balázs Vincze: 1995 , 1999 .

Awards
Hungarian Sport Team of the Year: 1958, 1961, 1962, 1973, 1974, 1976, 1977, 1993, 1997, 1999, 2000, 2003, 2004, 2008, 2013

See also
 Blood in the Water match
 Hungary men's Olympic water polo team records and statistics
 Hungary women's national water polo team
 List of Olympic champions in men's water polo
 List of men's Olympic water polo tournament records and statistics
 List of world champions in men's water polo
 List of members of the International Swimming Hall of Fame

References

External links
 
Hungarian Water Polo official website 

 
Men's national water polo teams
Men's sport in Hungary